The Bolivarian Republic of Venezuela is a federation made up of twenty-three states, a Capital District and the Federal Dependencies, which consist of many islands and islets in the Caribbean Sea. Venezuela also claims the Guayana Esequiba territory which comprises six districts in the independent nation of Guyana.

The states and territories of Venezuela are usually organized into regions, although these regions are mostly geographical entities rather than administrative entities.

Historical states

Prior to the Federal War (1859–1863), the country was divided into provinces rather than states (see Provinces of Venezuela). The victorious forces were supposed to grant more autonomy to the individual states, but this was not implemented.

From 1863 to the early 1900s there were numerous territorial changes, including the merger and splitting of states, but from then until the 1990s the states were left unchanged. States that existed during this time included Guzmán Blanco State (1873–1889). Originally a renamed Aragua State, in 1881 the states of Miranda, Guárico, Nueva Esparta and the Vargas department of the Federal District were merged into the state. This was part of a territorial reorganisation reducing the number of states from 20 to 9, which was reversed in 1901.

The 1990s saw the creation of three new states: Delta Amacuro (1991), Amazonas (1994), and Vargas (1998).

Regions

Venezuela's territory is generally divided into nine geographical regions, which are mostly used for geographical, cultural and planning purposes but do not have active administrative bodies.

States

Below is a list of the 23 states of Venezuela. The states are listed along with their correspondent emblems, data and location.

By Human Development Index

Special status areas

State name etymologies
Several states are named for historical figures:

Anzoátegui for José Antonio Anzoátegui
Bolívar for Simón Bolívar
Falcón for Juan Crisóstomo Falcón
Lara for Jacinto Lara
Miranda for Francisco de Miranda
Monagas for José Tadeo Monagas and José Gregorio Monagas
Sucre for Antonio José de Sucre
La Guaira (Vargas) for José María Vargas

Several states are named for natural features:
Amazonas is named for the Amazon Rainforest
Apure is named for the Apure River
Aragua for the Aragua River
Cojedes for the Cojedes River
Delta Amacuro for the river delta of the Orinoco River, and for the Amacuro River
Guárico for the Guárico River
Portuguesa for the Portuguesa River
Táchira for the Táchira River
Yaracuy for the Yaracuy River

Other naming origins:
Barinas, named after the indigenous ethnic group in the area 
Carabobo, named for an ethnic village
Caracas, named for the Caracas indigenous group
Mérida, for the capital city, Mérida, itself named for Mérida in Spain
Nueva Esparta ("New Sparta") is named for the heroism shown by its inhabitants during the Venezuelan War of Independence, deemed similar to that of the Spartan soldiers of Ancient Greece.
Trujillo, for the capital city, Trujillo, itself named for Trujillo in Spain
Zulia's name stems from a vocal transliteration from the Chibcha language, the name they called an exotic blue-flowered plant known as "Edging Lobelia" (Lobelia erinus); also for the Zulia River.

See also
 ISO 3166-2:VE
 Administrative divisions of Venezuela
 Demographics of Venezuela
 List of cities and towns in Venezuela

References

Bibliography
 Some information was retrieved from the Venezuelan National Institute of Statistics.

External links 

 CityMayors feature

 
Subdivisions of Venezuela
Venezuela, States
States, Venezuela
Venezuela geography-related lists